Ambrose Charles Drexel Greenway, 4th Baron Greenway (born 21 May 1941), is a British marine photographer and shipping consultant. He is one of the ninety hereditary peers elected to remain in the House of Lords after the passing of the House of Lords Act 1999, sitting as a crossbencher.

The son of the 3rd Baron Greenway, he was educated at Winchester College. In 1975, Greenway succeeded to his father's titles and in 1987, he was a younger brother of Trinity House. From 1994 to 2000, he was chairman of The Marine Society and from 1995 to 2004 Vice-President of the Sail Training Association. Between 2003 and 2017 he was also chairman of The World Ship Trust.

In 2008, he was Commodore of the House of Lords Yacht Club.

Since 1985, he has been married to Rosalynne Peta Fradgley.

Works
Soviet Merchant Ships (1976) 
Comecon Merchant Ships (1978) 
A Century of Cross-Channel Passenger Ferries (1981) 
All at Sea (1982) 
A Century of North Sea Passenger Steamers (1986) 
Cargo Liners: An Illustrated History (2009) 
Cross Channel and Short Sea Ferries: An Illustrated History (2014)

References

1941 births
Barons in the Peerage of the United Kingdom
Crossbench hereditary peers
Living people
People educated at Winchester College
Members of Trinity House

Hereditary peers elected under the House of Lords Act 1999